Planktonemertidae is a family of worms belonging to the order Polystilifera.

Genera:
 Crassonemertes Brinkmann, 1917
 Mergonemertes Brinkmann, 1917
 Mononemertes Coe, 1926
 Neuronemertes Coe, 1926
 Planktonemertes Woodworth, 1899
 Plenanemertes Coe, 1954
 Tononemertes Coe, 1954

References

Polystilifera
Nemertea families